Holmenkollen Ski Museum is located at the base of the Holmenkollen ski jump in Oslo, Norway.

The Ski Museum was founded in 1923 and is the world's oldest ski museum. The initiator of the museum was the architect Hjalmar Welhaven. His private collection formed the foundation of the antique and historic skis on display at the museum. Until 1951, the collection was housed in a building in the Oslo neighborhood of  Frognerseteren. In connection with the rebuilding of Holmenkollbakken in 1951, the  museum collection was moved to new premises at Holmenkollbakken.

The museum contains 4,000 years of skiing history, starting with rock carvings dating from the Stone Age. It also displays skiers and skis from the Viking Age. Additionally it displays equipment used in the polar expeditions of both Fridtjof Nansen and Roald Amundsen. The Ski Museum is owned and operated by Skiforeningen. This association is responsible for the organization of sports, activities and events in Holmenkollen National Park.

See also
Lahti Ski Museum

References

External links
 Museum home page

Other sources
Vaage, Jakob; Kristensen, Tom (1992)  Holmenkollen: historien og resultatene  (Stabekk: De norske bokklubben) .



Ski museums and halls of fame
Museums established in 1923
Museums in Oslo
Holmenkollen
1923 establishments in Norway
Sport in Oslo
Sports museums in Norway
Skiing in Norway